So Yu-jin (born August 11, 1981) is a South Korean actress. She is best known for her leading roles in the television dramas Rookie (2000), Delicious Proposal (2001), Fox and Cotton Candy (2001), as well as in Rival (2002) and Mai Ratima (2013).

Personal life
On January 19, 2013, So married Paik Jong-won, chef and CEO of 26 restaurant franchises with 169 branches across the country. Their first child, a son, was born on April 9, 2014. Their second child, a daughter, was born on September 21, 2015. In April 2016, So's father died the same day as of her son's birthday. On February 8, 2018, So gave birth to her third child, a daughter.

She became the goodwill ambassador for the Seoul International Beauty Industry Festival in April 2013. In March 2012, she became the goodwill ambassador for A Clean. On December 12, 2011, she became as a Goodwill Ambassador for the life sharing program.

Filmography

Television drama
My Healing Love (MBC,2018)
Five Children (KBS2, 2016)
Great Stories "The Kim Sisters" (TV Chosun/tvN, 2015)
Potato Star 2013QR3 (tvN, 2013) (cameo, ep 11)
Pretty Man (KBS2, 2013) (guest appearance, ep 1–4)
Drama Special "Happy! Rose Day" (KBS2, 2013)
Can't Live Without You (MBC, 2012) 
Happy Ending (jTBC, 2012)
Golden Fish (MBC, 2010)
Thirty Thousand Miles in Search of My Son (SBS, 2007–2008)
Unstoppable High Kick! (MBC, 2007) (cameo, ep 107)
Alone in Love (SBS, 2006) (cameo, ep 1)
Seoul 1945 (KBS1, 2006)
Cute or Crazy (SBS, 2005)
Banjun Drama (SBS, 2004–2005)
Good Person (MBC, 2003)
The Bean Chaff of My Life (MBC, 2003)
Rival (SBS, 2002)
Fox and Cotton Candy (MBC, 2001–2002)
Cool (KBS2, 2001)
Delicious Proposal (MBC, 2001)
Rookie (SBS, 2000–2001)
Virtue (SBS, 2000)

Film
Mai Ratima (2013) 
The Dinner (short film, 2011)
Break Away (2010)
Short! Short! Short! 2009: Show Me the Money (2009, short film "Sitcom") 
3 Colors Love Story (2006, short film "I'm O.K")
The Rainy Day (2005)
2424 (2002)
Rundim (2001, animated)

Variety show
 Oh Eun-Young Report - Southern Couple (2022, Host) 
 The Return of Super Mom (2021) (KBS2, Cast Member) Chuseok Special
 The Return of Superman (2020–present) (Narrator:Episode 341–present)
Show! Audio Jockey (tvN, 2019)
We Will Channel You (SBS, 2019)
Wonderful Day (MBC Music, 2012)
Section TV (MBC, 2001–2002)
Inkigayo (Popular Music) (SBS, 2001–2002)
Music Box (iTV, 2001)
In Search of the Best (SBS, 2000)

Theatre
Between Raindrops  (2008)
King Lear (2021)
 Kim Ji-young, Born 1982 as Kim Ji-young (2022) 
 The Seagull  as Arghona (2022–2023)

Radio program
To You Who Forget the Night with So Yoo-jin (KBS Happy FM, 2009)
Popular Songs with So Yoo-jin (KBS Happy FM, 2006)

Awards and nominations

References

External links

Living people
1981 births
South Korean television actresses
Place of birth missing (living people)
Dongguk University alumni
South Korean film actresses
Jinju So clan